Family Home Evening (FHE) or Family Night, in the context of the Church of Jesus Christ of Latter-day Saints (LDS Church), refers to one evening per week, usually Monday, that families are encouraged to spend together in religious instruction, prayer and other activities. According to the LDS Church, the purpose of FHE is to help families strengthen bonds of love with each other as well as provide an atmosphere where parents can teach their children principles of the gospel.

For many Latter-day Saint families, Family Home Evening includes a game or fun activity, treats, and a short lesson. The responsibilities for each are often rotated among family members, so that even the youngest may be assisted in presenting a short lesson or devotional on a given topic.  Parents often use this night as an opportunity to teach their children how to prepare talks and lessons, as well as how to conduct meetings.  Family business for the week may be addressed and the family schedule also reviewed.

History
In a letter dated April 27, 1915, and distributed to local leaders of the LDS Church, the church's First Presidency encouraged a church-wide practice of a weekly "Family Home Evening". The letter described the event as being a time set apart for "prayer ... hymns ... family topics ... and specific instruction on the principles of the gospel."

In 1970, church president Joseph Fielding Smith (son of Joseph F. Smith, who was president when the 1915 letter was issued) designated Monday night as the preferred time for Family Home Evening, asking local church units not to hold other church-related meetings or activities on that night. The New York Times reported in 1973 on Family Home Evening commenting it was, "their way of attacking delinquency and deteriorating morality is to strengthen family solidarity through a Monday night get‐together in the home called the 'family home evening'."

In the church's October 2002 General Conference, church president Gordon B. Hinckley encouraged public school officials and others to keep Monday night free of activities and other obstructions, so that members might more easily hold FHE.

Current church policy on Monday evenings states:

Members are encouraged to hold home evening on Sunday or at other times as individuals and families choose. A family activity night could be held on Monday or at other times. No Church activities, meetings, baptismal services, games, or practices should be held after 6:00 p.m. on Mondays. Other interruptions on Monday nights should be avoided.

A more recent version states:

Home evening is flexible according to members’ circumstances. It may be held on the Sabbath or other days and times. ... To provide time for families to be together, leaders should keep Monday evenings free from Church meetings and activities.

Church guidance
The LDS Church's website provides a page that includes resources to assist in holding Family Home Evening, including sample lessons, music, videos, art, and an online version of a published resource book.

Church leadership statements
Leaders of the LDS Church have made the following statements concerning Family Home Evening:

Family Home Evening away from home
In places with a high density of single adult members of the LDS Church, local wards or stakes organize Home Evening groups. The purpose of these meetings is the same as that of family-based Home Evenings, but groups are composed of peers rather than family members. Home Evening groups are most common near colleges and universities, including but not limited to LDS universities, such as Brigham Young University.

References

External links
 Family Home Evening website

1915 in Christianity
Family
Latter Day Saint culture
Latter Day Saint terms
Recurring events established in 1915
Worship services of the Church of Jesus Christ of Latter-day Saints
Young people and the Church of Jesus Christ of Latter-day Saints
Monday observances